Zay might refer to:
Zay people, an ethnic group of Ethiopia
Zay language, a language of Ethiopia
Zay (name) (includes a list of people with the name)
Zay (river), a river in Tatarstan, Russian Federation
Arabic letter zāy ز

See also 
 Zai (disambiguation)